Dayo Amusa  (born 20 July 1983) is a Nigerian actress, singer,  television personality,and business woman. She is well known for her performance in Nollywood movies especially Yoruba movies.

Early life and career
Dayo was born in Lagos. She is the first child in a family of Five. Her mother hails from Ogun state while her father is from Lagos. She attended Mayflower School, Ikene. Dayo studied Food Science and Technology at Moshood Abiola Polytechnic before commencing her acting career in 2002. Dayo had her first production in 2006. Although she acts mostly in Yoruba language films of Nollywood, she has also acted in English language films. Dayo is the Proprietress of PayDab Schools which has two locations in Ibadan and Lagos.

Awards

Singles
Aye Mii
Ayemi Remix ft Oritsefemi
Alejo
Blow My Mind
Mama's Love
Omodaddy
Ife Foju

Filmography 

Omoniyun
 Ogbe Kan Mi
 Eyin Igbeyawo
 Love is a six Letter word
 Vengeance
 Farugbotayin
 Mama swagger
 Tiwa's Story
 Adeife
 kokoro okan
 Iyawo Esu Devils wife
 Aipejola
 Oye Oran
 Ti Tabili Bayi

References

External links
 

Living people
Yoruba actresses
Actresses from Lagos
1983 births
Moshood Abiola Polytechnic alumni
21st-century Nigerian women singers
Nigerian film actresses
Nigerian women film directors
Actresses in Yoruba cinema
21st-century Nigerian actresses
Nigerian women educators
Yoruba educators
Yoruba women musicians
Founders of Nigerian schools and colleges
21st-century Nigerian educators
Mayflower School alumni
21st-century women educators